Cañizal is a municipality located in the province of Zamora, Castile and León, Spain. According to the 2009 census (INE), the municipality has a population of 541 inhabitants.

See also 
  www.Canizal-Zamora.es :: Photograph album of Cañizal.

References

Municipalities of the Province of Zamora